Otto is an unincorporated community in Big Horn County in the U.S. state of Wyoming.  It was named for Otto Franc, a local cattle baron who ranched in the Big Horn Basin.  The community is located near the Greybull River on Wyoming Highway 30 between Basin and Burlington.

Public education in the community of Otto is provided by Big Horn County School District #1. Children attend Burlington Elementary School (grades PK-6), Burlington Junior High School (grades 7–8), and Burlington High School (grades 9–12). All three campuses are located in the nearby town of Burlington.

Otto is mostly a farming community and is surrounded by many flood irrigated fields. The main crops are; corn, sugar beets, beans and grains.  In the community itself one can find a park where a baseball diamond, soccer field, playground equipment, and picnic benches can be found.

References

Unincorporated communities in Big Horn County, Wyoming
Unincorporated communities in Wyoming